The Off-Shore Pirate is a 1921 American silent romantic comedy film produced and released by Metro Pictures and directed by Dallas Fitzgerald. The film was based on the short story "The Offshore Pirate" by F. Scott Fitzgerald, of no relation to the director, that was published in The Saturday Evening Post. Viola Dana and Jack Mulhall star in the film. It is not known whether the film currently survives.

Plot
As summarized in a film publication, Ardita Farnam (Dana), wealthy and beautiful, had a will of her own and a yacht. When her uncle (Jobson) indicated that he wanted her to meet a certain man, she decided that she wanted to marry a foreigner, saying she wanted a man with a past rather than a future. Alone on her yacht one evening Ardita heard some jazz melodies floating over the waves. A good-looking man (Mulhall) along with six black musicians came aboard. They tell Ardita that they have been giving a charity performance that afternoon and at the end had relieved the audience of their valuables, and now intended to use the yacht to escape. They go out to sea. Later the leader, who calls himself Curtis Caryle, is put off the yacht. Ardita feels sorry for him and follows him. Then her uncle arrives. The man explains that he is Toby Moreland, the man her uncle wanted her to meet. She says that she knew it all along and decides to marry him.

Cast
Viola Dana as Ardita Farnam
Jack Mulhall as Toby Moreland
Edward Jobson as Uncle John Farnam
Edward Cecil as Ivan Nevkova

References

External links

1921 films
American silent feature films
Metro Pictures films
Films based on short fiction
1921 romantic comedy films
American romantic comedy films
American black-and-white films
Films directed by Dallas M. Fitzgerald
Films based on works by F. Scott Fitzgerald
1920s American films
Silent romantic comedy films
Silent American comedy films